Lawson Graham is a studio album by Canadian hip hop producer Factor. It was released on Fake Four Inc. in 2010. It features guest appearances from Gregory Pepper, Cars & Trains, Radical Face, Sole, Myka 9, Ceschi, and Moka Only. It is an ode to Factor's grandfather.

Critical reception
Rick Anderson of AllMusic gave the album 3.5 stars out of 5, saying, "it's emotionally sophisticated rap, and that really is quite unusual." Thomas Quinlan of Exclaim! said, "Lawson Graham is certainly an excellent attempt by Factor to appeal to a wider audience, which is also likely to lead to a greater range of co-conspirators he can work with in the future."

Confront Magazine named it the 2nd best album of 2010.

Track listing

References

External links
 

2010 albums
Fake Four Inc. albums
Alternative hip hop albums by Canadian artists
Factor (producer) albums